The S60 Platform (formerly Series 60 User Interface) was a software platform for smartphones that runs on top of the Symbian operating system. It was created by Nokia based on the 'Pearl' user interface from Symbian Ltd. It was introduced at COMDEX in November 2001 and first shipped with the Nokia 7650 smartphone. The platform has since seen 5 updated editions. Series 60 was renamed to S60 in November 2005.

In 2008, the Symbian Foundation was formed to consolidate all the assets of different Symbian platforms (S60, UIQ, MOAP), making it open source. In 2009, based on the code base of S60, the first iteration of the platform since the creation of Symbian Foundation was launched as S60 5th Edition, or Symbian^1, on top of Symbian OS 9.4 as its base. Subsequent iterations were named Symbian^2 (Japanese market only) and Symbian^3.

The S60 software was a multivendor standard for smartphones that supports application development in Java MIDP, C++, Python and Adobe Flash. Its API was called Avkon UI. S60 consists of a suite of libraries and standard applications, such as telephony, personal information manager (PIM) tools, and Helix-based multimedia players. It was intended to power fully featured modern phones with large colour screens, which are commonly known as smartphones.

Originally, the most distinguishing feature of S60 phones was that they allowed users to install new applications after purchase. Unlike a standard desktop platform, however, the built-in apps are rarely upgraded by the vendor beyond bug fixes. New features are only added to phones while they are being developed rather than after public release. Certain buttons are standardized, such as a menu key, a four way joystick or d-pad, left and right soft keys and a clear key.

S60 was mainly used by Nokia but they also licensed it to a few other manufacturers, including Lenovo, LG Electronics, Panasonic, Samsung, Sendo, Siemens Mobile, Sony Ericsson, Solstice and Vertu. Sony Ericsson notably was the main vendor using the competing UIQ Symbian interface.

In addition to the manufacturers the community includes:
 Software integration companies such as Sasken, Elektrobit, Teleca, Digia, Mobica, Atelier.tm
 Semiconductor companies Texas Instruments, STMicroelectronics, Broadcom, Sony, Freescale Semiconductor, Samsung Electronics
 Operators such as Vodafone and Orange who develop and provide S60-based mobile applications and services
 Software developers and independent software vendors (ISVs).

Editions 

There have been four major releases of S60: "Series 60" (2001), "Series 60 Second Edition" (2002), "S60 3rd Edition" (2005) and "S60 5th Edition" (2008). Each release had an updated version called Feature Pack, sometimes known as relay. Each runs on a different Symbian version.

Series 60 1st Edition The devices' display resolution was fixed to 176×208. The Siemens SX1 meanwhile had 176×220.
Version 0.9 was the original and first shipped with Nokia 7650.
Version 1.2 (marketed as Feature Pack 1) first shipped with Nokia 3600/3650 in 2003.

Series 60 2nd Edition Also known as S60v2.
Version 2 was the original and first shipped with Nokia 6600.
Version 2.1 (Feature Pack 1) first came with Nokia 6620.
Version 2.6 (Feature Pack 2) first came with Nokia 6630.
Version 2.8 (Feature Pack 3) first started shipping with Nokia N70 in September 2005. FP3 now supports multiple resolutions, i.e. Basic (176×208), and Double (352×416). The N90 was the first Series 60 device to support a higher resolution (352×416).

S60 3rd Edition S60v3 uses a hardened version of Symbian OS (v9.1), which has mandatory code signing. In S60v3, a user may install only programs that have a certificate from a registered developer, unless the user disables that feature or modify the phone's firmware through third-party hacks that circumvent the mandatory signing restrictions. This makes software written for S60 1st Edition or 2nd Edition not binary-compatible with S60v3.
Version 3 was first introduced with Nokia N91 in 2006.
Version 3.1 (Feature Pack 1) first shipped with Nokia N95.
Version 3.2 (Feature Pack 2) first shipped with Nokia N78.

In 2006, a "Designed for S60 Devices" logo program for developers was launched. The logotype can be used with conforming programs regardless of them being native Symbian or Java.

S60 5th Edition In October 2008 Symbian^1, also known as S60v5, was launched as the first OS under the Symbian Foundation, based on the S60 code so therefore also called S60 5th Edition. Nokia skipped the number 4 as they traditionally always do (due to East Asian tetraphobia). S60 5th Edition runs on Symbian OS version 9.4. The major feature of 5th Edition is support for high-resolution 640×360 touchscreens; before 5th Edition, all S60 devices had a button-based user interface. S60 5th Edition also integrates standard C/C++ APIs and includes Adobe Flash Lite 3.0 with S60-specific ActionScript extensions that give Flash Lite developers access to phone features like contacts, text messaging, sensors and device location information (GPS). Despite the introduction of S60 5th Edition, the 3rd Edition continued to be marketed new as well, as 5th Edition is specially designed for, and exclusively available on touchscreens.

Version 5 was first introduced with Nokia 5800 XpressMusic in 2008.

S60 5th Edition was the last edition of S60. It was succeeded by Symbian^2 (based on MOAP) and Symbian^3 in 2010.

Versions and supported devices 
Many devices are capable of running the S60 software platform with the Symbian OS. Devices ranging from the early Nokia 7650 running S60 v0.9 on Symbian OS v6.1, to the latest Samsung i8910 Omnia HD running S60 v5.0 on Symbian OS v9.4. In Symbian^3 the version of the revised platform is v5.2.

The table lists devices carrying each version of S60 as well as the Symbian OS version on what it is based. Note that new devices since Symbian^3 May be capable of upgrading to later systems, such as Symbian Anna and Symbian Belle. Therefore, you may see a device being listed more than once.

Symbian is now progressing through a period of organisational change to metamorph into an open source software platform project. As an OS, Symbian OS originally provided no user interface (UI), the visual layer that runs atop an operating system. This was implemented separately. Examples of Symbian UIs are MOAP; Series 60; Series 80; Series 90 and UIQ. This separation of UI from underlying OS has created both flexibility and some confusion in the market place. The Nokia purchase of Symbian was brokered with the involvement of the other UI developers and all major user interface layers have been (or have been pledged to be) donated to the open source foundation who will independently own the Symbian operating system. The new Symbian Foundation has announced its intent to unify different Symbian UIs into a single UI based on the S60 platform. (Announcements made in March 2009 indicated this would be the S60 5th edition with feature pack 1).

Symbian Anna 
On 12 April 2011, Nokia announced Symbian Anna as a software update to the Symbian^3 release.
Three new devices (500, X7 and E6) were announced which will have Symbian Anna pre-installed. Symbian Anna will be available as a Software Update for Symbian^3 based devices as well.
Most Significant updates that come with "Anna" are
 Portrait QWERTY with split-view data entry
 New Icon Set
 New internet browser with an improved user interface, search-integrated address field, faster navigation and page loading.
 Updated Ovi Maps (search public transport, download full country maps via WLAN or Nokia Ovi Suite, check-in to Facebook, Twitter and Foursquare).
 Java Runtime 2.2, Qt Mobility 1.1 and Qt4.7.

Symbian Belle 
On 24 August 2011, Nokia announced Symbian Belle (later renamed Nokia Belle) as a software update to the Symbian Anna release.
Three new devices (603, 700 and 701) [Nokia 600 is cancelled and is replaced with Nokia 603] were announced which will have Symbian Belle pre-installed. Symbian Belle was available as a Software Update for Symbian Anna-based devices as well.
Most Significant updates that came with "Belle" were
 Free-form, differently-sized, live widgets
 More homescreens
 Improved status bar
 Dropdown menu
 Modernised navigation
 New apps
 Informative lock screen
 NFC devices
 Visual multitasking

Symbian Carla and Donna 
In November 2011, Nokia announced the Carla and Donna updates. Carla was expected to be released in late 2012 or early 2013 and feature a new web browser, new widgets, new NFC capabilities and Dolby Surround audio enhancement. Donna was going to be a dual-core processor exclusive, and was planned to be released late 2013 or early 2014. In May 2012 a Nokia executive claimed that Carla and Donna were cancelled, and that Nokia would instead only release Belle Feature Pack 2 later in 2012, lacking many of the new features that were planned for Carla and Donna.

Legacy 
In February 2011, Nokia announced a partnership with Microsoft to adopt Windows Phone 7 as Nokia's primary operating system, leaving further Symbian development in question. Nokia has promised support for Symbian and its newer devices until at least 2016, but no new Symbian devices will be released after Nokia 808 PureView. On 29 April 2011, Nokia announced that it would transfer Symbian activities to Accenture along with 3,000 employees.

See also 
 Series 20
 Series 30
 Series 30+
 Sailfish OS, the open source Linux platform based on MeeGo from Jolla, the company which was established by ex-Nokia employees.
 Android OS, a partly open-source mobile platform by Google
 Maemo, Nokia's Debian Linux-based platform
 MOAP, another Symbian-based platform
 Series 40, Nokia's non-Symbian-based platform for mass-market devices.
 Series 80
 Series 90
 UIQ, another Symbian-based platform
 Web Browser for S60

References 

Symbian Belle
Symbian Belle – the facts, the features and the pictures

External links 

 Forum Nokia – S60 developer site
 Forum.Nokia.com – S60 2nd/3rd Edition: Differences in Features v1.5
 Forum Nokia Russia – S60 developer site
 Open Letter from Nokia CEO to Microsoft CEO

 
Series 60
Software that uses Qt